The Journal of Helminthology is a bimonthly peer-reviewed scientific journal established in 1923. It covers all aspects of pure and applied helminthology, particularly those helminth parasites of environmental health, medical, or veterinary importance. According to the Journal Citation Reports, the journal has a 2014 impact factor of 1.421.

References

External links

English-language journals
Zoology journals
Cambridge University Press academic journals